The Volkswagen Taro 1 tonne pickup truck was introduced in January 1989 by Volkswagen Commercial Vehicles to complement the half tonne Caddy pickup / panel van ranges, and the 1 tonne Transporter van and chassis cab ranges. The name "tarō" is a suffix used in Japanese to denote the oldest brother or son, or the first-born son of a family.

The Taro was a project of badge engineering. The Taro was a rebadged fifth generation Toyota Hilux, which was fully engineered and designed by Toyota. The two companies came together in an effort to solve each other's problems:
Volkswagen Group at the time did not have a one-tonne pickup truck.
Toyota wanted a bigger European market share of the one-tonne utility market.

History

In the late 1980s, Volkswagen Group and Toyota signed an agreement that Volkswagen Commercial Vehicles would assemble the Toyota Hilux at its VWCV factory in Hanover, Germany, and it would be sold under the Volkswagen Taro moniker.

The Hanover plant only built the Taro with two-wheel drive and a regular cab, although the "Volkswagen Taro" name was used for other versions imported from Japan in some European markets.

In September 1994 at the IAA Nutfahrzeuge (Commercial Vehicle Fair) in Hanover, Germany, Volkswagen released the four-wheel drive version of the Taro which had an extended cabin.

The joint venture ended in 1997, due to sales failing to meet either car marque's expectations.

Specifications
engine ID code, displacement, configuration and rated power output
2Y: 1.8-litre inline four OHV petrol engine with carburettor,  at 4,000 rpm
4Y: 2.2-litre inline four OHV petrol engine with carburettor, 
2L: 2.4-litre inline four indirect injection SOHC diesel engine,  at 4,000 rpm,  at 2,400 rpm
22R: 2.4-litre inline four SOHC petrol engine with Bosch L-Jetronic injection, 
driveline 4x2 = RWD, 4x4 = 4WD
loading area (m²) (4x2) 3.1m² (4x4) 2.9m²
track width - front (4x2) , (4x4) 
track width - rear (4x2) , (4x4) 
turning circle (4x2) , (4x4) 
permissible total weight(4x2) , (4x4) 
payload(4x2) , (4x4) 
trailer weight braked(4x2) , (4x4) 
trailer weight unbraked 
maximum speed km/h(4x2) , (4x4) 
acceleration - 0- (4x2) 15.0 secs, (4x4) 17.0 secs
fuel consumption (4x2) , (4x4) 

Specifications Source

Successor   
Volkswagen Commercial Vehicles division sells the Volkswagen Amarok pick-up, which competes against the Nissan Navara and Toyota Hilux.

The Amarok is available in single and double cab versions, as well as the option of 2WD or 4WD and high torque diesels.

References

External links
Volkswagen-Commercial-Vehicles.com - official international portal

Taro
Pickup trucks
Rear-wheel-drive vehicles
All-wheel-drive vehicles
Cars introduced in 1989
1990s cars
Cars discontinued in 1997